Parlance is a studio album by American bassist Steve Swallow recorded together with British pianist John Taylor. The album was released in 1995 via Instant Present label.

Track listing

Personnel
Band
Steve Swallow – bass
John Taylor – piano

Production
Brian Bennett – producer
Philippe Laffont – engineer
Mark Van – assistant engineer

References

Steve Swallow albums
1995 albums